Jahid Afrail oglu Huseynli, known professionally as JONY (born ) is an Azerbaijani-Russian singer-songwriter. The winner of the second season of the show The Masked Singer (2021) on the  NTV channel.

Biography

Early period 
Jahid was born on February 29, 1996, in Baku. By nationality - Azerbaijani.  At the age of 4 he moved with his family to Moscow. At the age of 6 he went to the 1925th gymnasium in Novokosino. In the first grade, he began to sing in the school choir and impressed his teachers with his vocals. And already in the ninth grade, the future singer realized that he wanted to seriously connect his life with music.

However, Jony's father did not support his son's decision, as he wanted him to follow in his footsteps and become a businessman. Therefore, after graduating from school, Jony entered State University of Management at the Faculty of International Business. True, according to the artist himself, he studied there without much enthusiasm.

After graduation of  Master's degree Jony realized that he wanted to play music professionally and asked his father to give him a chance to try his hand at it.:«I was 22 years old when I asked my father to give me a chance to try my hand at something I love. Working for my father, who is the director of the company, is the easiest way, but he did not suit me and did not satisfy my ambitions.

I only added at the same time that if something doesn’t work out for me, I will return and admit that I am a fool. But in the depths of my soul I knew that I could not come to my father with my head bowed and admit my defeat - what kind of man am I after that?".

The beginning of a musical career 
Even while studying at the university, Jony began recording various cover-versions of popular songs and publish them in Instagram profile. Soon the young singer was noticed by Elman Zeynalov (El'man). He invited Jony to his RAAVA Music team.

Jony began working on his own songs and after a while released five compositions - "Empty Glass", "Friend Zone", "Star", "Alley" and "I'm Not Me Without You" (together with HammAli & Navai). he video filmed for the song "Alley" received more than 100 million views on YouTube and brought the artist fame on the Internet.

In September 2019, Jony released the song "Comet", which soon topped the Apple Music chart and became the singer's signature song.

In 2020, the album "Heavenly Roses" was released. Four compositions became the most successful: "You are merciless", "The world has gone crazy", "You bet" and "It rains outside the window".

In 2021, he left RAAVA Music and decided to pursue a solo career.

Artist nickname 
As a child, Jahid really liked the cartoon «Johnny Bravo», so his mother jokingly began to call him Jony. Later, the singer began to introduce himself this way at school, when classmates could not remember his name.«I got used to the name "Jony", even my mother calls me that since I was three years old. Only my grandparents in Azerbaijan call me by my first name. But parents and friends - almost never. Most often "Jony", "Jo"».

Discography

Studio albums

Singles

Participation in albums of other artists

Music videos

Filmography

Awards

References 

Azerbaijani singers
Russian musicians
21st-century Russian singers
Russian singers
Living people
1996 births
21st-century Russian musicians
Russian singer-songwriters